Topol may refer to:

Missiles
 RT-2PM Topol, a Russian intercontinental ballistic missile in service from 1985
 RT-2PM2 Topol-M, a Russian intercontinental ballistic missile in service from 1997

People
 Topol (surname)
 Chaim Topol, Israeli actor known as simply Topol

Places
 Topol, Bloke, Slovenia, a settlement
 Topol pri Begunjah, Slovenia, a village formerly named simply Topol
 Topol pri Medvodah, Slovenia, a settlement formerly named Topol

Other
 Topol Show, a Czech web talk show hosted by former Czech Prime Minister Mirek Topolánek

See also
 
 Topal (disambiguation)
 Topo (disambiguation)
 Topola (disambiguation)